Sources: Common Trees of India, Pippa Mukherjee, World Wildlife Fund India/ Oxford University Press 1983, Flowering Trees and Shrubs in India, D.V. Cowen

References